Clowers is a surname which means "son of the nailer". Notable people with the surname include:

Bill Clowers (1898–1978), American baseball player
Tommy Clowers (born 1972), American motorcycle racer

See also
 Clower

References

English-language surnames
Patronymic surnames